Shelton High School (SHS) is a public high school in Shelton, Connecticut, in eastern Fairfield County. It has an enrollment of approximately 1400 in grades 9 through 12.

History

The first four SHS graduates received their diplomas on June 26, 1889. In 1894, the First School Society became the Town School Committee, with Walter D. Hood as the first school superintendent.

Extracurricular activities

The Gael Magazine
The school magazine is called the Gael Magazine. This magazine publishes in the fall, winter and spring.

Athletics
Shelton High is part of the Housatonic Division of the Southern Connecticut Conference.  The school offers a variety of freshman, JV, and Varsity teams. The following sports run in the respective seasons:

The Shelton Gaels high school football team won the state championship in 1988, 1995, 2000, and 2003.

The Shelton Gaels high school boys' volleyball team won the state championship in 2004 and 2005, with a 46-0 record. The team won the Southern Connecticut Conference title in 2015 and 2017.

The Shelton Gaels Varsity Cheerleading squad won the state championship in the 2000-2001 season.

The Shelton boys' cross country team won its first division championship, and the SCC championship in 2007, making its first trip to the New England championships. In 2008, it placed second in the CIAC State Open Championships, and fourth in the New England Championships.

2011 Prom 

The Shelton High School headmaster banned a senior and two friends from attending the senior prom because the students had taped a message of 12-inch high cardboard letters above the school's entrance inviting Tate's classmate, Sonali Rodrigues, to go to the dance with him. In addition to giving the students in-school suspensions for what she described as a safety issue, the headmaster described the act as trespassing and banned them from the dance.

The ban became the subject of protests on Facebook and was reported on national and international media.

Shelton Mayor Mark Lauretti and Shelton High School alumnus NFL quarterback Dan Orlovsky questioned the appropriateness of the punishment.  Connecticut governor Dannel Malloy sided with the student, saying, "While it seems that there are rules that were broken, in this case, it doesn’t seem as though the punishment fits the crime." The punishment prompted state lawmakers Jason Perillo (R-Shelton) and Sean Williams (R-Waterbury) to introduce an amendment to a pending bill that, with an exception for vandalism and violence, would require schools to offer parents an alternative to banning students from school-related activities as means of punishment.

On May 12, the headmaster announced that she stood behind her decision, citing long-standing policy. Protests at the school continued the next day, with students being sent home saying they'd been told they were "inciting a riot and breach of peace". On May 14, the headmaster held a press conference reversing the decision, saying that "the level of distraction created by this incident" had "affected the culture of Shelton High School" and that "international notoriety" had forced her to reverse herself.

Notable alumni 

 Dan Orlovsky (2001), NFL quarterback
 Dan Debicella (1992), Connecticut State Senator

References

External links
 Shelton High School website
 Shelton High School "Strategic School Profile 2005-2006" from the state Department of Education
 School's Web page at Great Schools Web site

Schools in Fairfield County, Connecticut
Public high schools in Connecticut
Buildings and structures in Shelton, Connecticut
Educational institutions established in 1973
1973 establishments in Connecticut